The 1991 Hamburg state election was held on 2 June 1991 to elect the members of the 14th Hamburg Parliament. The incumbent government was a coalition of the Social Democratic Party (SPD) and Free Democratic Party (FDP) led by First Mayor Henning Voscherau. As the SPD won an absolute majority of seats, it formed government alone, and Voscherau continued in office.

Parties
The table below lists parties represented in the 13th Hamburg Parliament.

Election result

|-
! colspan="2" | Party
! Votes
! %
! +/-
! Seats 
! +/-
! Seats %
|-
| bgcolor=| 
| align=left | Social Democratic Party (SPD)
| align=right| 393,414
| align=right| 48.0
| align=right| 3.0
| align=right| 61
| align=right| 6
| align=right| 50.4
|-
| bgcolor=| 
| align=left | Christian Democratic Union (CDU)
| align=right| 287,467
| align=right| 45.1
| align=right| 5.4
| align=right| 44
| align=right| 5
| align=right| 36.4
|-
| bgcolor=| 
| align=left | Green Alternative List (GAL)
| align=right| 59,262
| align=right| 7.2
| align=right| 0.2
| align=right| 9
| align=right| 1
| align=right| 7.4
|-
| bgcolor=| 
| align=left | Free Democratic Party (FDP)
| align=right| 44,460
| align=right| 5.4
| align=right| 1.1
| align=right| 7
| align=right| 1
| align=right| 5.8
|-
! colspan=8|
|-
| bgcolor=| 
| align=left | The Republicans (REP)
| align=right| 9,959
| align=right| 1.2
| align=right| 1.2
| align=right| 0
| align=right| ±0
| align=right| 0
|-
| bgcolor=grey|
| align=left | The Grays – Gray Panthers (GRAUE)
| align=right| 7,219
| align=right| 0.9
| align=right| New
| align=right| 0
| align=right| New
| align=right| 0
|-
| bgcolor=|
| align=left | Others
| align=right| 17,992
| align=right| 2.2
| align=right| 
| align=right| 0
| align=right| ±0
| align=right| 0
|-
! align=right colspan=2| Total
! align=right| 819,773
! align=right| 100.0
! align=right| 
! align=right| 121
! align=right| 1
! align=right| 
|-
! align=right colspan=2| Voter turnout
! align=right| 
! align=right| 66.1
! align=right| 13.4
! align=right| 
! align=right| 
! align=right| 
|}

Sources
 Bürgerschaft Hamburg Landesstimmen

1991 elections in Germany
1991 state election
1991
June 1991 events in Europe